Louis C. Gawthrop is Eminent Scholar and Professor, Government and Public Administration at the University of Baltimore.
 
He was editor-in-chief of Public Administration Review from 1978 to 1984.

He received his Ph.D. from Johns Hopkins University.

Publications
Bureaucratic Behavior in the Executive Branch
The Administrative Process and Democratic Theory
Administrative Politics and Social Change
Public Sector Management, Systems, and Ethics
Public Service and Democracy: Ethical Imperatives for the 21st Century

References

Year of birth missing (living people)
Living people
University of Baltimore faculty
Johns Hopkins University alumni